Estuaire may refer to:
 Estuaire (Gabon), a province in Gabon
 Estuaire (biennale), a contemporary art exhibition in France